is a Japanese women's football team which played Japan Women's Football League.

History
Albero Kobe was founded as Aguilas Kobe in 2003. In 2010 season, Aguilas Kobe was promoted Japan Women's Football League. In 2012 season, the club withdrew league and changed club name to Albero Kobe.

See also
List of women's football clubs in Japan

References

External links
Official site

Women's football clubs in Japan